Hop Bottom Creek (also known as Hopbottom Creek) is a tributary of Martins Creek in Susquehanna County, Pennsylvania, in the United States. The creek is not designated as an impaired waterbody. It is a relatively small stream with a deep valley. The surficial geology in the creek's vicinity mainly consists of Wisconsinan Till, alluvium, bedrock, and wetlands.

The watershed of Hop Bottom Creek is relatively long in a north-south direction and narrow in an east-west direction. The area in the vicinity of the creek was settled by 1787. The first gristmill in Susquehanna County was built on the creek. A number of bridges have also been constructed over it. The creek is not stocked with trout, but does have angling opportunities.

Course
Hop Bottom Creek begins in an unnamed lake near Pennsylvania Route 706 in Bridgewater Township. It flows south-southwest into Heart Lake, which is in both Bridgewater Township and New Milford Township. From the southern end of the lake, the creek flows west and then southwest in Bridgewater Township, entering Lake Chrisann after a few tenths of a mile. From the southern end of this lake, the creek flows south-southeast and then south-southwest for several tenths of a mile before turning west-southwest for a few tenths of a mile. It then turns in a south-southwesterly direction for more than a mile, approaching Pennsylvania Route 167 (which it crosses a number of times) and entering Brooklyn Township. After some distance in Brooklyn Township, the creek turns southeast for several tenths of a mile before turning south-southwest and then south-southwest. After some distance, the creek gradually begins meandering southwest for more than a mile before meandering south-southeast and southeast for a few miles, still flowing alongside Pennsylvania Route 167. The creek then turns south for more than a mile, entering Lathrop Township. Here, it turns southeast for several tenths of a mile, entering Hop Bottom and crossing Pennsylvania Route 167 for the last time. At this point, it turns east-northeast, reentering Lathrop Township and reaching its confluence with Martins Creek.

Hydrology
Hop Bottom Creek is not designated as an impaired waterobdy.

The water temperature of the creek ranged from  during six measurements. The creek's pH ranged from 6.5 to 7.5 and its specific conductance ranged from 95 to 149 micro-siemens per centimeter.

Geography and geology

Hop Bottom Creek is a relatively small stream that meanders through a deep valley. In its upper reaches, it has a clean channel. The headwaters of Hop Bottom Creek are in a beaded valley, with alternating broad and narrow segments. Wetlands or lakes sometimes occur in the broad parts.

The surficial geology along the lower reaches of Hop Bottom Creek mainly consists of alluvium. However, a till known as Wisconsinan Till is found nearby in larger areas, and some bedrock consisting of sandstone and shale is also present. Additionally, there is one wetland patch nearby. The surficial geology in the creek's headwaters is fairly similar, but there is no alluvium above Lake Chrisann, only Wisconsinan Till.

Soils in the vicinity of Hop Bottom Creek include Wyalusing silt loam, Holly silt loam, Wellsboro channery silt, and Lordstown and Oquaga stony silt loams. The first two of these are hydric, the third is mostly non-hydric, and the fourth is non-hydric.

A mitigation bank project on Hop Bottom Creek and some of its unnamed tributaries was proposed in 2015. Oxbow scars in the floodplain of the creek indicate that the creek's channel has moved around its valley over time.

Watershed
The mouth of the creek is in the United States Geological Survey quadrangle of Hop Bottom. However, its source is in the quadrangle of Montrose East. The creek's watershed is relatively long and narrow. It is in the vicinity of the watersheds of West Branch Meshoppen Creek, Horton Creek, Martins Creek, Salt Lick Creek, and Snake Creek.

A lake known as Heart Lake is situated on Hop Bottom Creek. The creek's watershed is relatively sparsely populated.

The designated use for Hop Bottom Creek is aquatic life. There is a United States Geological Survey gauging station on the creek at Brooklyn.

The valley of Hop Bottom Creek was cultivated by the early 1900s. There are active farming operations in the vicinity of the creek.

History
Hop Bottom Creek was entered into the Geographic Names Information System on August 2, 1979. Its identifier in the Geographic Names Information System is 1177377. The creek is also known as Hopbottom Creek. This variant name appears in a 1981 highway map of Susquehanna County, created by the Pennsylvania Department of Transportation. The creek is named for the wild hops that historically grew within its valley. The creek's name has been described as "quaint".

The community of Hop Bottom, which is located near Hop Bottom Creek, was established in 1787. The first gristmill in Susquehanna County was constructed on Hop Bottom Creek. There was historically a cotton factory in the vicinity of the creek.

A steel stringer/multi-beam or girder bridge carrying State Route 2015 over Hop Bottom Creek was built in 1945 and was repaired in 1993. A concrete culvert bridge carrying State Route 2015 over the creek was built in 1959 and repaired in 1998.

Biology
Hop Bottom Creek is designated as a Coldwater Fishery. Hop Bottom Creek was described as having "excellent" fishing opportunities in the Tunkhannock Creek Watershed Conservation Plan in 1998. However, the creek is not stocked with trout. Eels have historically been observed in the creek.

Historically, wild hops grew on the banks of the creek near the community of Hop Bottom. One of the largest blocks of unfragmented forest is on the banks of the creek.

See also
Dry Creek (Martins Creek), next tributary of Martins Creek going upstream
List of rivers of Pennsylvania

References

Rivers of Susquehanna County, Pennsylvania
Tributaries of Tunkhannock Creek
Rivers of Pennsylvania